Nummer 10 is the training ground of the Danish Superliga team F.C. Copenhagen. It is located in Frederiksberg and opened in 2006. The name is after the address of the training centre, which is Jens Jessens Vej 10.

External links 
 Official Website

Association football training grounds in Denmark
F.C. Copenhagen